Slaton is a surname. Notable people with this name include:
Bryan Slaton (born 1978), American businessman
Danielle Slaton (born 1980), American former soccer player
Dorothy Lamour (born Mary Leta Dorothy Slaton; 1914–1996), American actress
James D. Slaton (1910/12–1961), American U.S. Army corporal
Jessie Pharr Slaton (1908–1983), American lawyer
Jim M. Slaton (born 1950), American football pitcher
Jim P. Slaton (born 1970), American skydiver
John M. Slaton (1866–1955), American former governor of Georgia
Mike Slaton (born 1964), American former football player
Steve Slaton (born 1986), American former football running back
Steve Slaton (DJ) (born 1953), American DJ
Tedarrell Slaton (born 1997), American football nose tackle
Tony Slaton (born 1961), American former football player
The Slaton family, titular stars of 1000-lb Sisters

See also
Slaton, Texas
Slatton